Oldenlandia corymbosa, commonly known as flat-top mille graines  or diamond flower, is a species of plant in the family Rubiaceae. It is an annual herb with ascending or erect stems which are 4-angled.

Gallery

References

External links
 
  
 
 

corymbosa